M-157 is a short state trunkline highway in the US state of Michigan. The highway is entirely within Roscommon County in the Lower Peninsula.  It is the fourth-shortest state highway in the system, and it serves as a connector route between M-18 and M-55 just east of Prudenville. The current roadway was built and designated as M-157 in the 1930s.

Route description
 
M-157 begins at an intersection with M-55 east of Prudenville and Houghton Lake. The trunkline angles to the northwest before turning north near Ryan Lake. Serving as a short connector, the highway travels north through the Roscommon State Forest terminating just over a mile later at a junction with M-18. A newspaper article in 1972 describing the shortest highways in the state to "important places" listed M-157 as a "short-cut" between the two highways.  The Michigan Department of Transportation (MDOT) conducts surveys in 2008 that showed 496 vehicles per day, on average.

History
 
M-157 was originally designated in 1931 as a connector route between M-55 and US 27 (present-day M-18). Just a year later, that version was decommissioned, and the road obliterated. A new alignment, the present-day routing of M-157, was then commissioned just to the east.

Major intersections

See also

References

External links

M-157 at Michigan Highways

157
Transportation in Roscommon County, Michigan